The suicide bombing at Binyamina Railway Station was a Palestinian suicide bombing near Binyamina Railway Station in the town of Binyamina-Giv'at Ada, Israel, on 16 July 2001.

The Palestinian Islamic Jihad group claimed responsibility for the attack.

The attack 
The suicide bomber was 20-year-old Nidal Shaduf, from a village near Jenin. After infiltrating Israel, he entered Binyamina. It has been theorized that he intended to blow himself up inside the crowded railway station, but found he could not enter due to a heavy police presence and stringent security measures. As a result, he detonated at a soldiers' bus stop near the train station, waiting until it began filling with people before detonating.

The suicide bomber detonated at 7:35 PM. Two Israel Defense Forces (IDF) soldiers were killed, and eleven people were injured, two of them seriously.

Aftermath 

Israeli security forces immediately froze all train traffic between Tel Aviv and Haifa. Israeli Police set up a dragnet to capture a vehicle which had been seen dropping the bomber off, using patrol cars, special forces, and helicopters, but without success. Several Palestinians illegally in Israel were caught in the area and taken into custody.

The IDF responded by attacking, primarily with tank fire, Palestinian Authority security installations and Force 17 positions. Israeli helicopters also struck a house in Bethlehem belonging to Fatah militants, killing four.

Both the United States and Palestinian Authority condemned the attack.

References

External links
 Two soldiers killed, six people injured in suicide bombing near Binyamina - Haaretz Daily Newspaper | Israel News
 Two Soldiers Killed in Binyamina Suicide Bombing Attack - - News - Israel National News

Binyamina-Giv'at Ada
Suicide bombing in the Israeli–Palestinian conflict
July 2001 events in Asia
Suicide bombings in 2001
2001 in rail transport
Attacks on railway stations